The 1999 Privilege Insurance British GT Championship was the seventh season of the British GT Championship, an auto racing series organised by the British Racing Drivers Club (BRDC) and sponsored by Privilege.  The races featured grand touring cars conforming to two categories of regulations known as GT1 and GT2, and awarded a driver championship in each category.  This was the final season that the GT1 class competed in the series.  The season began on 28 March 1999 and ended on 10 October 1999 after eleven events, all held in Great Britain with one race in Belgium.  The series was joined by the BRDC Marcos Mantis Challenge Cup for several events.

Jamie Campbell-Walter and Julian Bailey won the GT1 championship for Lister Storm Racing, while David Warnock won the GT2 category for Cirtek Motorsport.

Calendar
All races were 50 minutes in duration.

Entries

GT1

GT2

Race results

External links
 

British GT Championship seasons
1999 in British motorsport